Sima Liang (司馬亮) (before 227- 25 July 291), courtesy name Ziyi (子翼), formally Prince Wencheng of Ru'nan (汝南文成王), was briefly a regent during the reign of Emperor Hui during Jin Dynasty (266–420).  He was the first of the eight princes commonly associated with the War of the Eight Princes.

Life
Sima Liang was the fourth son of Sima Yi, by his concubine, Lady Fu; he was the eldest among Lady Fu's four sons. During the regencies within Cao Wei by his older half-brothers Sima Shi and Sima Zhao, he served as a mid-level official.  After his nephew Sima Yan took the throne as Emperor Wu of Jin, ending Cao Wei and establishing Jin, Sima Liang was created the Prince of Fufeng on 9 February 266 and put in charge of the military commands of Qin (秦州, modern eastern Gansu) and Yong (雍州, modern central and northern Shaanxi) provinces.  In 270, after his subordinate, the general Liu Qi (劉旂) was defeated by the Xianbei rebel Tufa Shujineng, Sima Liang tried to have Liu's life spared by claiming fault; Liu's life was spared, but Sima Liang lost his post as a result.

Despite this, Sima Liang was well respected among the Jin imperial clan for his virtues, including his filial devotion to Princess Dowager Fu.  Because of this, Emperor Wu put him in charge of monitoring the imperial princes' behavior, to correct and rebuke them when necessary.

On 5 October 277, Emperor Wu moved Sima Liang's principality to Ru'nan and put him in charge of the military commands of Yu Province (豫州, modern eastern Henan).  However, soon he recalled Sima Liang back to the capital to serve as a high-level advisor.

As Emperor Wu grew ill in 289, he considered whom to make regent. He considered both Empress Yang Zhi's father Yang Jun and Sima Liang. As a result, Yang Jun became fearful of Sima Liang and had him posted to the key city of Xuchang. Several other imperial princes were also posted to other key cities in the empire. By 290, Emperor Wu resolved to let Yang and Sima Liang both be regents, but after he wrote his will, the will was seized by Yang Jun, who instead had another will promulgated in which Yang alone was named regent. Emperor Wu died soon thereafter and was succeeded by Emperor Hui.  By this point, Sima Liang had not yet gone to Xuchang, but was fearful of Yang Jun, and so did not dare to attend Emperor Wu's wake.  Yang was still suspicious that Sima Liang might have a coup in mind, and so prepared for his troops to attack Sima Liang.  (Indeed, the justice minister He Xu (何勗) suggested to Sima Liang that he overthrow Yang, but Sima Liang refused.)  In order to avoid a military confrontation with Yang, Sima Liang immediately left for Xuchang.

After Empress Jia Nanfeng, Emperor Hui's wife, in conjunction with Emperor Hui's brother Sima Wei the Prince of Chu, overthrew and killed Yang in a coup in spring 291, Sima Liang, as the most respected of the imperial princes, was summoned back to the capital Luoyang to serve as regent, along with Wei Guan.  To appease those who might have been angry and had overthrown Yang Jun, Sima Liang widely promoted those who participated in the plot, and more than a thousand men were created marquesses. He and Wei, however, did try to get the government on track, but Empress Jia continued to interfere with governmental matters. They also became concerned about the violent temper of Sima Wei and therefore tried to strip him of his military command, but Sima Wei persuaded Empress Jia to let him keep his military command. Sima Wei's assistants Qi Sheng (岐盛) and Gongsun Hong (公孫宏) thereafter falsely told Empress Jia that Sima Liang and Wei planned to depose the emperor. Empress Jia, who had already resented Wei for having, during Emperor Wu's reign, suggested that he change his heir selection, also wanted more direct control over the government, and therefore resolved to plot a second coup.

In summer 291, Empress Jia had Emperor Hui personally write an edict to Sima Wei, ordering him to have Sima Liang and Wei Guan removed from their offices. His forces thereby surrounded Sima Liang and Wei Guan's mansions, and while both men's subordinates recommended resistance, each declined and was captured. Against what the edict said, both were killed—Sima Liang with his heir Sima Ju (司馬矩) and Wei Guan with nine of his sons and grandsons.  (Initially, the soldiers respected Sima Liang and did not dare to kill him, and indeed, as he sat in the prisoner's wagon, it appeared clear that he was suffering from the heat, and passersby were allowed to use fans to try to alleviate his suffering.  Only after Sima Wei issued an order that whoever dared to cut off Sima Liang's head would receive a large sum of silk as reward did someone carry out the execution.)  After Empress Jia, concerned about Sima Wei's power, then falsely declared that the edict was forged by Sima Wei and had him executed, Sima Liang was posthumously honored.

Family

References

 Fang, Xuanling. Book of Jin (Jin Shu).

Year of birth unknown
291 deaths
Jin dynasty (266–420) imperial princes
Jin dynasty (266–420) regents
Executed Jin dynasty (266–420) people
People executed by the Jin dynasty (266–420) by decapitation
3rd-century executions